Woxen is a Nordic surname. Notable people with the surname include:

Einar Woxen (1878–1937), Norwegian barrister and journalist
Greta Woxén (1902–1993), Swedish civil engineer 

Surnames of Scandinavian origin